Family with sequence similarity 105, member B is a protein in humans that is encoded by the FAM105B gene.

References

Further reading 

Genes on human chromosome 5